= Intelligent life in the Universe =

About intelligent life in the Universe, see:

- Life
- Extraterrestrial life § Evolution
